Clavulina caespitosa is a species of coral fungus in the family Clavulinaceae. Found in Guyana, it was described as new to science in 2005.

References

External links

Fungi described in 2005
Fungi of Guyana
caespitosa